Matjama is a village in Peipsiääre Parish, Tartu County, Estonia. It is located by the Jõhvi–Tartu–Valga road (E264). As of 2011 Census, the settlement's population was 55.

Matjama was the location of one of the earliest libraries in Tartu County, established in 1883.

Theologist, orientalist and syriologist Arthur Võõbus (1909–1988), was born in Matjama.

References

Villages in Tartu County